The American Red Cross National Headquarters is located at 430 17th Street NW in Washington, D.C.  Built between 1915 and 1917, it serves both as a memorial to women who served in the American Civil War and as the headquarters building for the American Red Cross.  It was declared a National Historic Landmark in 1965.

Description
The national headquarters of the American Red Cross is located in central Washington, on the east side of a city block bounded by 17th, D, and E Streets NW.  This block, on the west side of The Ellipse south of the White House, is entirely devoted to Red Cross facilities.  The main headquarters building is a large stone structure, faced in white Vermont marble.  It is three stories in height, its third floor recessed behind a balustrade.  Its east-facing main facade has a central classical temple portico, with six Corinthian columns supporting a gabled pediment with a red cross at the center.  The flanking building bays are articulated by attached Corinthian columns.  The main bronze doorways lead into a large central marble entrance hall, with a broad stairway to the second floor.  Niches in the hall are filled with sculptural depictions of "Faith", "Hope", and "Charity", executed by Hiram Powers.

Tiffany windows
The Board of Governors room contains three Favrile windows by designer Louis Comfort Tiffany. The windows are notable for being the largest suite of Tiffany windows outside a religious building.  Unlike many other Tiffany windows, these windows have remained in their original setting.  The costs of these windows were donated by two organizations of Civil War women: the Woman's Relief Corps of the North and the United Daughters of the Confederacy.  The left panel was based on Henry Wadsworth Longfellow's poem, "Santa Filomena" that honored the work of Florence Nightingale. The center panel depicts the conception of the International Red Cross and Red Crescent Movement at the Battle of Solferino near Solferino, Italy. The right panel depicts a scene from Edmund Spenser's poem "The Faerie Queene".

History
The American Red Cross was founded in 1881 in the aftermath of the American Civil War as a unique public-private partnership for providing disaster relief and medical support for military forces.  This headquarters building was built between 1915 and 1917 to a design by Trowbridge & Livingston. It cost approximately $800,000 and was dedicated on May 12, 1917.

See also
List of National Historic Landmarks in Washington, D.C.
National Register of Historic Places listings in central Washington, D.C.

References

External links

American Red Cross Museum

1917 establishments in Washington, D.C.
American Red Cross
Buildings and structures completed in 1917
Foggy Bottom
Historic American Buildings Survey in Washington, D.C.
Monuments and memorials to women
National Historic Landmarks in Washington, D.C.
Neoclassical architecture in Washington, D.C.